Drillia tholos is a species of sea snail, a marine gastropod mollusk in the family Drilliidae.

Description
Drillia tholos is a species of marine snail native to Natal, California. Dead Drillia tholos often form shallow marine sediments. The shells attain lengths of 5 mm, its diameter 2 mm, dextrally coiled.

Distribution
This species occurs in the demersal zone off East London, South Africa.

References

  Barnard K.H. (1958), Contribution to the knowledge of South African marine Mollusca. Part 1. Gastropoda; Prosobranchiata: Toxoglossa; Annals of The South African Museum v. 44 pp. 73–163
 Tucker, J.K. 2004 Catalog of recent and fossil turrids (Mollusca: Gastropoda). Zootaxa 682:1–1295

Endemic fauna of South Africa
tholos
Gastropods described in 1958